The inverted black triangle was an identification badge used in Nazi concentration camps to mark prisoners designated asozial ("asocial") and arbeitsscheu ("work-shy"). The Roma and Sinti people were considered asocial and tagged with the black triangle. The designation also included alcoholics, beggars, homeless people, lesbians, nomads, prostitutes, and violators of laws prohibiting sexual relations between Aryans and Jews. Women also deemed to be anti-social included nonconformists.

Usage

Nazi

The symbol originates from Nazi Germany, where every prisoner had to wear a concentration camp badge on their prison clothes, of which the design and color categorized them according to the reason for their internment. The homeless were included, as were alcoholics, those who habitually avoided labor and employment, draft evaders, pacifists, Roma and Sinti people, and others.

Romani 
Male Romani were later assigned a brown triangle. Female Romani were still deemed asocials as they were stereotyped as petty criminals (prostitutes, kidnappers and fortune tellers).

Disabled people
Some UK groups concerned with the rights of disabled people have adopted the symbol in their campaigns. Such groups cite press coverage and government policies, including changes to incapacity benefits and disability living allowance, as the reasons for their campaigns. "The Black Triangle List" was created to keep track of welfare-related deaths due to cuts by the Department for Work and Pensions.

See also
 Antiziganism
 Aktion Arbeitsscheu Reich
 Action T4
 Anti-homelessness legislation
 Discrimination against the homeless

References

Further reading

 
 Marshall, Stuart. "The Contemporary Use of Gay History: The Third Reich," in Bad-Object Choices (ed.), How Do I Look? Queer Film and Video, Seattle, Wash.: Bay Press, 1991.

Class discrimination
Conscientious objection
History of anarchism
Lesbian culture
LGBT symbols
Nazi concentration camps
Triangles